Sarath Ekanayake is the former Chief Minister of the Central Province of Sri Lanka. He previously served as the 2nd, 4th and 7th Chief Minister of Central Province between April and June 1999, November 2000 and April 2002 and 2004 till 2015. He was also the Governor of the North central Province. He belongs to the Sri Lanka Freedom Party and is part of the United People's Freedom Alliance. He is also the president of the Sri Lanka Basketball Federation.

References

Sri Lankan Buddhists
Chief Ministers of Central Province, Sri Lanka
Members of the Central Provincial Council
Living people
Sri Lanka Freedom Party politicians
United People's Freedom Alliance politicians
Sinhalese politicians
Year of birth missing (living people)